St. Mary's Residential Central School Ramankulangara, Kollam, India, was started in 1987. It has become a full-fledged school and is affiliated to The Central Board of Secondary Education( C.B.S.E ). It was founded in 1987 by Dr. P. T Abraham, an educationist and a philanthropist. The school is managed by ST Mary's Educational and cultural society Thiruvalla.

St. Mary's Educational and cultural society, a charitable organization, was registered in 1974, with a view to render its service in Educational and social service. In the same year, St. Mary's Residential Central School was founded by the brother of the late Chev.T.Thomas, the founder of St.Mary's group of Schools and colleges in Chennai. In 1987, he started 5 more secondary schools in Thiruvananthapuram, Kollam, Alappuzha, Pathanapuram and Kayamkulam. The School began operation in a rented building at Tangasseri with 275 students on roll. The Senior Secondary School has classes from L.K.G to XII.It offers Science and Commerce stream at +2 level. At present school has 1000 students and 50 teaching staff on roll.

Crest 

The school's crest is the two alphabets S and M joined together and encrypted on a shield with a crown on top. Below the shield there is a band with the Latin writing "Domine Illumina Me" means Enlighten me, O Lord.

History 

St. Mary's Residential Central School, Ramankulangara Kollam is managed by St. Mary's Educational and cultural society Thiruvalla.

St. Mary's Educational and cultural society, a charitable organization was registered in 1974, with a view to render its service in Educational and social service . To begin with, the same year, St. Mary's Residential Central School was founded by eminent educationist Dr. P. T. Abraham, a person with a vision and farsightedness. He followed the footsteps of his brother, the late Chev. T. Thomas, the founder of St. Mary's group of schools and colleges in Chennai.

In 1987, he started 5 more secondary schools in Thiruvananthapuram, Kollam, Alappuzha, Pathanapuram and Kayamkulam. The life of Dr.PT Abraham (Baby Mulamoottil) is a saga of distinctive achievement as Sportsmen, Entrepreneur, Educationist, Social worker and founder of a large number of Educational Institutions in Kerala and Karnataka. He believes that the best way to serve the society is in helping the not-so-privileged in the area of Education. With missionary zeal, he then started various technical colleges and Teacher Training colleges in Thiruvalla and Bangalore. It is with his Blessings and invaluable guidance that St.Mary's Residential School at Ramankulangara was able to cross several milestones and become a Senior Secondary School.

The School had a humble beginning in a rented building at Tangasseri with 275 students on roll.Mr. Mathew.P.Abraham, the second son of Dr.PT Abraham, and the Project Manager of our school is instrumental in making their school into a full-fledged Senior Secondary School having classes from L.K.G to XII.It offers Science and Commerce stream at +2 level. At present school has 1000 students and 50 teaching staffs on roll.

Uniform 

The school uniform is a white and biscuit colour stripes shirt, biscuit colour skirt for girls and biscuit colour pants for boys (shorts till 5th grade), a school tie with biscuit colour and white slanted stripes till 10th grade and maroon tie for senior year with the school emblem badge, belt of biscuit colour with the school emblem on the buckle, black shoes and biscuit colour socks. An identity tag is worn.

External links
 Official website
 St Mary's school group

Central Board of Secondary Education
Boarding schools in Kerala
Primary schools in Kerala
High schools and secondary schools in Kerala
Schools in Kollam
Educational institutions established in 1987
1987 establishments in Kerala